Gen Miskit is the oldest mosque in the Maldives built . It is made of coral stone and was built straight after the conversion to Islam.

Gen Miskit is located in the district of Dhadimago at the northern end of the island.

References

Mosques in the Maldives